Irving Mall is an enclosed American shopping mall located in Irving, Texas, at the intersection of Texas State Highway 183 (Airport Freeway) and Belt Line Road. It has over 80 stores, including four anchor tenants , plus a food court with the only international restaurant being Subway.

It is under ownership of Washington Prime Group. On Sunday, June 13, 2021, Washington Prime Group, which owns Irving Mall, filed for chapter 11 bankruptcy protection.

History 
The mall opened with Titche-Goettinger, JCPenney, and Sears.

JCPenney was closed as part of 44 underperforming stores and closed in 2001.

The mall received a renovation in 1984 adding the west wing of the mall along with two new anchors, Dillard's and Mervyn's and a new food court. The General Cinema, which opened in 1971 would later expand to 7 screens in the same year.

In 1999, General Cinema moved to a spot where a former Wilson's Catalog Showroom used to be. In the same year as part of Irving Mall's redevelopment, Barnes & Noble also opened in the former General Cinema 1–3. Barnes & Noble closed in 2012 and is now a Shoppers World.

In 2002, AMC took over the former General Cinema at the mall, it was renovated in 2013.

Current anchors include Macy's, Dillard's Clearance Center, Burlington Coat Factory, and La Vida Fashion and Home Decor.

In 2014, the mall was spun off into Washington Prime Group

In 2015, Sears Holdings spun off 235 of its properties, including the Sears at Irving Mall, into Seritage Growth Properties.

On October 15, 2018, it was announced that Sears would be closing as part of a plan to close 142 stores nationwide. The store closed in early January and currently sits vacant

Shootings
The first shooting happened in 1990 where Tom Broom, who killed a man named Eddie Edwards who was chasing his girlfriend in the parking lot and shooting her with a .38-caliber revolver. Broom stopped the man by shooting him with a Ruger .44-caliber Magnum pistol in the head twice, killing him.

The mall's most known shooting was in 1993 when 2 gangs got in a fight, with one person shooting 2 people and killing an innocent bystander, Kevin Reuss Bacon. The 2 others were in critical condition.
 On September 4, 2022, shots were fired at the mall when two people were having an argument. No one was struck by the gunfire.

Current anchors
 Dillard's Clearance Center (opened 1984, relocated from Plymouth Park Shopping Center)
 Burlington (opened 2006 in former JCPenney)
 Macy's (opened 2006 in former Foley's)
 La Vida (Location now closed.)
 [[ Las Lomas Irving halls of banquets ( store ) (opened in the first floor of former Mervyn's)

Former Anchors
Sears (opened in 1971, closed 2019)

JCPenney (opened in 1971, closed 2001)

Titche-Goettinger (opened in 1971, merged with Joske's, closed 1979)

Joske's (opened 1979, closed 1987 after merging with Dillard's)

Foley's (opened 1989, was acquired by Macy's)

Mervyn's (opened 1983, closed 2006)

Transportation
DART Route  goes by it on Belt Line.

See also
List of shopping malls in Dallas, Texas

References

External links
Irving Mall Website

Shopping malls established in 1971
Washington Prime Group
Shopping malls in the Dallas–Fort Worth metroplex
Buildings and structures in Irving, Texas
Tourist attractions in Dallas County, Texas
1971 establishments in Texas